A Matter of Life and Death may refer to:

Film and television
 A Matter of Life and Death (film), a 1946 Powell and Pressburger film starring David Niven
 A Matter of Life and Death (Zitima Zois kai Thanatou), a 1972 film by Vagelis Serdaris based on a crime novel by Yannis Maris
 A Matter of Life and Death (play), a 2007 stage adaptation of the 1946 film
 "Matter of Life and Death" (Space: 1999), the second episode of Space: 1999 television series
 "A Matter of Life and Death", the fifth episode of The Honeymooners television series

Books
 A Matter of Death and Life, a novel by Andrey Kurkov
 A Matter of Life and Death, a book by Alistair McGowan and Ronni Ancona

Music
 A Matter of Life and Death (album), a 2006 album by Iron Maiden

See also
 Life and death (disambiguation)